Joel P. Makovicka (born October 6, 1975, in Brainard, Nebraska) is a former American football fullback who played for the Arizona Cardinals (1999–2002).

Joel Makovicka is one of the most decorated fullbacks in Husker history and owns the school record with 13 career touchdowns as a fullback for Nebraska from 1995 to 1998. During his stay at Nebraska, Makovicka was a two-time first-team academic All-American and three-time first-team academic All-Big 12 performer. He also was a member of three national championship teams. The younger brother of another Husker walk-on fullback from Brainard, Neb., Jeff Makovicka, Joel finished his career with 1,447 yards rushing on an average of 5.9 yards per carry while making 22 starts for the scarlet and cream. As a junior, he produced the fourth-highest rushing total by a fullback in school history with 685 yards. He was drafted by the Arizona Cardinals in the fourth round of the 1999 NFL Draft and started 10 games at fullback for the Cardinals as a rookie.

See also
 Colin Allred - former NFL linebacker who became a lawyer and US Representative
 Tommy Casanova - former NFL player who became an ophthalmologist
 Dennis Claridge – former NFL quarterback who became an orthodontist
 Dan Doornink – former NFL running back who became a medical doctor
 Laurent Duvernay-Tardif – current NFL player who earned a medical degree while playing in the league
 John Frank - Super Bowl winning SF 49er who became a NY City based plastic surgeon
 Bill McColl - former NFL player who became an orthopedic surgeon, father of Milt McColl
 Milt McColl - former NFL linebacker who became a medical doctor
 Frank Ryan – former NFL player and mathematician, who maintained an academic career while playing in the league
 Myron Rolle – former NFL defensive back who was also a Rhodes scholar and is now serving a neurosurgery residency
 John Urschel – former NFL player and mathematician who was a PhD candidate while playing in the league
 Byron White - former NFL running back who became a US Supreme Court Justice
 Rob Zatechka – former NFL guard who became a medical doctor

1975 births
Living people
American football fullbacks
Arizona Cardinals players
Nebraska Cornhuskers football players